The Paniai gudgeon (Oxyeleotris wisselensis) is a species of fish in the family Butidae endemic to the Paniai Lakes (absent from Lake Paniai itself, but present in both Lake Tigi and Tage) and their tributaries in West Papua, Indonesia. It is popularly used as a bait fish.

References

Oxyeleotris
Freshwater fish of Western New Guinea
Fish described in 1982
Taxonomy articles created by Polbot